Rilaena is a genus of the harvestman family Phalangiidae.

R. triangularis, the most common species, is sometimes considered to be in the genus Paraplatybunus, in the subfamily Platybuninae.

Species
 Rilaena artvinensis Kurt 2015
 Rilaena atrolutea (Roewer, 1915) (Caucasus)
 Rilaena augusti Chemini, 1986 (Italy)
 Rilaena augustini Chemini, 1986 (Italy)
 Rilaena balcanica Silhavý, 1965
 Rilaena buresi Silhavy 1965
 Rilaena caucasica Snegovaya & Tchemeris 2016
 Rilaena gruberi Starega, 1973
 Rilaena hyrcanus (Thorell, 1876) (Iran)
 Rilaena silhavyi Snegovaya & Tchemeris 2016
 Rilaena serbica Karaman, 1992 (former Yugoslavia)
 Rilaena pusilla (Roewer, 1952)
 Rilaena spinosissimus Hadzi, 1973
 Rilaena triangularis (Herbst, 1799)

References
 's Biology Catalog: Phalangodidae

Harvestmen
Arachnids of Europe